Mamiella is a genus of green algae in the family Mamiellaceae.

References

External links

Chlorophyta genera
Mamiellophyceae